Kamal Salman Masud (born 1979 in London, UK) is a former Olympic swimmer from Pakistan. In 1996, he became the first ever Pakistani swimmer to participate in any Olympic Games.

Family life
Masud was born in London to a Pakistani father, Salman and a Trinidadian mother, Veena. At an early age, his parents decided to relocated to Pakistan. His mother is the Honorary Secretary of Pakistan Women's Swimming Association.

Career

College
Masud swam collegiately for Johns Hopkins University.  He graduated from Johns Hopkins University in 2001.

South Asian Games
Masud took part in the 7th edition in Madras (now Chennai), India where is won 4 individual medals in freestyle (2) and butterfly (2).

He also took part in the 8th edition where he won two gold medals for butterfly.

References

Pakistani male swimmers
Olympic swimmers of Pakistan
1979 births
Living people
Swimmers at the 1996 Summer Olympics
Swimmers at the 2000 Summer Olympics
Swimmers at the 1994 Asian Games
Swimmers at the 1998 Asian Games
South Asian Games gold medalists for Pakistan
South Asian Games silver medalists for Pakistan
South Asian Games bronze medalists for Pakistan
Asian Games competitors for Pakistan
South Asian Games medalists in swimming